Cape Sterneck is a bold, black cliff on a projecting point forming the west extremity of Chavdar Peninsula on the west coast of Graham Land, Antarctica.  It is situated on the north side of the entrance to Hughes Bay and the west side of the entrance to Curtiss Bay, and separating Davis Coast to the northeast from Danco Coast to the southwest.

In 1898, the Belgian Antarctic Expedition under Lieutenant Adrien de Gerlache explored this area and named this cape for the Austrian geophysicist Robert von Sterneck, whose apparatus was used on the expedition. The British name for the feature is Cape Herschel.

Maps
 British Antarctic Territory.  Scale 1:200000 topographic map. DOS 610 Series, Sheet W 64 60.  Directorate of Overseas Surveys, Tolworth, UK, 1978.
 Antarctic Digital Database (ADD). Scale 1:250000 topographic map of Antarctica. Scientific Committee on Antarctic Research (SCAR). Since 1993, regularly upgraded and updated.

See also

References

Further reading 
 Ute Christina Herzfeld, Atlas of Antarctica: Topographic Maps from Geostatistical Analysis of Satellite Radar Altimeter Data, P 115

External links
 Cape Sterneck. SCAR Composite Gazetteer of Antarctica

Headlands of Graham Land
Danco Coast
Davis Coast